Intencity Family Entertainment Centres (trading as Intencity) is a chain of amusement arcades owned by Australian company Village Roadshow Limited, with locations in NSW, VIC, SA and TAS. The chain was originally launched in 1995 as part of a venture called Village Nine Leisure (a partnership between Village, Nine Network and Westfield Group).

References

External links

Entertainment companies of Australia
Video arcades
Entertainment companies established in 1995
Australian companies established in 1995